The 1993 European Beach Volleyball Championships were held in August, 1993 in Almería, Spain. It was the first official edition of the men's event.

Men's competition

References
 Results

1993
E
B
1993